The Summit Range is a mountain range in San Bernardino County, California.

They are one of the eastern limits of the Fremont Valley, and in the Mojave Desert.

References 

Mountain ranges of the Mojave Desert
Mountain ranges of San Bernardino County, California